Gregoire Mirindi Carhangabo is a Congolese politician and Union for the Congolese Nation Member of the National Assembly of the Democratic Republic of the Congo.

He was previously aligned to the People's Party for Reconstruction and Democracy.

References

Year of birth missing (living people)
Living people
Members of the National Assembly (Democratic Republic of the Congo)
People's Party for Reconstruction and Democracy politicians
Union for the Congolese Nation politicians
21st-century Democratic Republic of the Congo people